Colton is the primary hamlet and a census-designated place (CDP) in the town of Colton in St. Lawrence County, New York, United States. As of the 2010 census, it had a population of 345, out of 1,451 in the entire town of Colton.

The community is in central St. Lawrence County, in the northwest corner of the town of Colton. It is bordered to the west by the town of Pierrepont and to the north by the town of Parishville. It sits on both sides of the Raquette River, which drops  in elevation through the hamlet, on its way north to join the St. Lawrence River near the Canadian border.

New York State Route 56 runs through Colton, leading north  to Potsdam and southeast  to New York State Route 3 in the Adirondacks. State Route 68 leads west from Colton  to Canton.

Demographics

References 

Census-designated places in St. Lawrence County, New York
Census-designated places in New York (state)